Louis Dupichot (born 23 September 1995 in Paris) is a French rugby union player. He plays as a winger for Racing Métro in the Top 14.

Notes and references

External links 
It's Rugby profile

French rugby union players
1995 births
Living people
Racing 92 players
Section Paloise players
Rugby union wings
Rugby union players from Paris